The 1990 Virginia Slims of California was a women's tennis tournament played on indoor carpet courts at the Oakland-Alameda County Coliseum Arena in Oakland, California in the United States and was part of the Tier II category of the 1990 WTA Tour. It was the 19th edition of the tournament ran from October 29 through November 4, 1990. Second-seeded Monica Seles won the singles title.

Finals

Singles
 Monica Seles defeated  Martina Navratilova 6–3, 7–6(7–5)
 It was Seles' 8th singles title of the year and the 9th of her career.

Doubles
 Meredith McGrath /  Anne Smith defeated  Rosalyn Fairbank-Nideffer /  Robin White 2–6, 6–0, 6–4
 It was McGrath's 3rd doubles title of the year and the 4th of her career. It was Smith's 3rd doubles title of the year and the 31st of her career.

References

External links
 Official website
 ITF tournament edition details
 Tournament draws

Virginia Slims of California
Silicon Valley Classic
Virginia Slims of California
Virginia Slims of California
Virginia Slims of California
Virginia Slims of California